Patrice Gélard (3 August 1938 – 25 June 2020) was a French politician who served as a member of the Senate of France. He represented the Seine-Maritime constituency and was a member of the Union for a Popular Movement (UMP) Party.

Gélard died on 25 June 2020 at the age of 81.

References

External links
Page on the Senate website

1938 births
2020 deaths
French Senators of the Fifth Republic
Politicians from Toulon
Union for a Popular Movement politicians
Senators of Seine-Maritime
Mayors of places in Normandy
University of Paris alumni
Chevaliers of the Légion d'honneur
Officers of the Ordre national du Mérite
Laureates of the Honorary Diploma of the Verkhovna Rada of Ukraine
National Institute for Oriental Languages and Civilizations people